The Hot Boys (often styled as Hot Boy$) are an American hip hop group formed in New Orleans, Louisiana in 1997. The group is made up of B.G., Lil Wayne, Juvenile and Turk.

The group was originally formed in 1997, and released their debut recording studio LP Get It How U Live! the same year on then-independent label Cash Money to local success, selling 400,000 copies primarily in the south. They followed up with 1999's Guerrilla Warfare, the group's most commercially successful album to date, selling 142,000 copies in its first week and debuting at #5 on the Billboard 200. The album was certified Platinum on November 1, 1999, by the RIAA. The group disbanded in 2001 when Juvenile, Turk, and B.G. left Cash Money, citing financial mismanagement, leaving Lil Wayne as the only original member signed to the label. Despite this, one more Hot Boys album was released, 2003's Let 'Em Burn, composed of material originally recorded between 1998 and 2000.

Many setbacks have prevented the group from having an official reunion. In 2006, Turk was sentenced to 14 years in prison for second degree attempted murder, slowing down plans for a reunion in 2009. Shortly before Turk's release from prison in 2012, B.G. was sentenced to 14 years in prison for gun possession and witness tampering. Despite this, the group has managed to release one song together, a remix of Turk's 2012 song "Zip It".

History
The Hot Boys formed in the summer of 1997 with original members B.G., Lil Wayne, Juvenile, Turk and Birdman's nephew Bulletproof AKA Lil Derrick. Lil Derrick left the group shortly after recording the first album and was killed in 2002.

The Hot Boys made their first official appearance together on B.G.'s third studio album, It's All on U, Vol. 1. They soon released their debut album, titled Get It How U Live!, which sold over 300,000 copies, primarily in New Orleans. The album charted nationally as well at 37 on the Billboard R&B/Hip-Hop Albums Chart. In 1998, Ca$h Money agreed to a $30 million pressing and distribution deal with Universal Records. This led to releases such as Juvenile's 400 Degreez, which was certified 4× Platinum in America. The Hot Boys made numerous appearances on many of the albums' tracks such as, "Back That Azz Up" featuring Lil Wayne and Mannie Fresh, and "Ha", where the Hot Boys were featured in the music video and the remix. The Hot Boys appeared on both B.G. and Lil Wayne's albums in 1999, Chopper City In The Ghetto, by B.G., and, Tha Block Is Hot , by Lil Wayne Both albums were certified Platinum. The group also released singles such as, "Cash Money Is An Army" and "Bling Bling" by B.G., "Tha Block Is Hot" and "Respect Us" by Lil Wayne, and "U Understand" and "I Got That Fire" by Juvenile.

On July 27, 1999, The Hot Boys released their second major label studio album, Guerrilla Warfare, which reached No. 1 on the Billboard magazine Top R&B/Hip-Hop Albums chart and No. 5 on the Billboard 200.  It featured two charting singles, "We On Fire" and "I Need A Hot Girl". "I Need a Hot Girl" peaked at No. 65 on the Billboard Hot 100.  The album also had contributions from the Big Tymers, Baby and Mannie Fresh. Like with the group's previous album, Mannie Fresh produced every track.

By 2003 B.G., Turk, and Juvenile had all departed from Cash Money for financial issues, leaving Lil Wayne as the group's only member still with the label. Cash Money still managed to release the group's final album together, Let 'Em Burn, composed of songs the group recorded between 1998 and 2000. The Hot Boys went on to have solo recording careers with varying degrees of success. Lil Wayne became the most prolific Hot Boy, with all of his albums going at least Gold in America and amassing a large fan base which grew with the development of his boutique label, Young Money. Turk was sentenced to 14 years imprisonment in 2006 and was released in October 2012. Juvenile and B.G. initially showed resentment to Cash Money but over time settled their disputes and disagreements with the label.

Following the group's disbandment in 2001, the group remained on hiatus until 2009, when Lil Wayne brought out Juvenile and B.G. at one of his shows on the I Am Music Tour in New Orleans. Lil Wayne had been reportedly trying to spearhead a Hot Boys reunion beginning in 2008, with the support of the other group members. However, by 2012, only two songs featuring Lil Wayne, Juvenile, and B.G. materialized: "Ya Heard Me" from B.G.'s 2009 album Too Hood 2 Be Hollywood and the exclusive "If I Ain't a Hot Boy". Although Turk was released from prison in 2012, talks of a reunion were quelled when B.G. was arrested for weapons possession in 2009 and subsequently sentenced to 14 years in federal prison for gun possession and witness tampering in 2012. In December 2012, Turk released a song called "Zip It" featuring Lil Wayne on his SoundCloud account. A few weeks later, a remix was released with Juvenile featured on the last verse. In February 2013, a version with all four members of the group was released, with B.G. recording his verse over the phone from prison. In 2013, The Hot Boys (minus B.G.) appeared in the video of 2 Chainz's song "Used 2", whose lyrics are reminiscent of Juvenile's "Back That Azz Up". "Used 2" was produced by Mannie Fresh, who also appears in the video. The Hot Boys (without B.G.) performed with Mannie Fresh during Lil Wayne's Lil WeezyAna Fest in August 2015. Lil Wayne, Juvenile, and The Big Tymers reunited on a song called "Hate" in 2016.

Discography

Studio albums

Collaboration albums
 Baller Blockin' with Cash Money Millionaires (2000)

Singles

As lead artist

Filmography
 Baller Blockin' (2000)

References

External links

Cash Money Records artists
American hip hop groups
African-American musical groups
Musical groups from New Orleans
Musical quartets
Gangsta rap groups